Strangeulation Vol. II is the sixteenth studio album by American rapper Tech N9ne, the sixth in his "Collabos" series. The album was released on November 20, 2015, by Strange Music. It features the entire Strange Music roster, including their new signees JL B.Hood, Darrein Safron, and Mackenzie Nicole. The album serves as a sequel to Strangeulation, the previous Tech N9ne Collabos album.

Commercial performance
On the chart dated December 12, 2015, Strangeulation Vol. II debuted on the US Billboard 200 chart at number 25, powered by first week sales 23,969 equivalent album units; it sold 22,380 copies in its first week, with the remainder of its unit total reflecting the album's streaming activity and track sales. It became Tech N9ne's second album to chart at number one on the Billboard Independent Albums in 2015. The album has sold 50,000 copies in the US as of November 2016.

Track listing
 All tracks were produced solely by Seven except for "Torrid", which was co-produced by Tyler Lyon.

 Notes
 Track listing and credits from album booklet.
 "Intruders" (skit) features additional vocals by Lauren Robson
 "Tell Me If I'm Trippin'" features additional vocals by Flip, Mary Harris and Prozak
 "Chilly Rub" features additional vocals by Kelsee Pietz
 "Strangeulation Vol. II Cypher IV" features additional vocals by Kelsee Pietz and Skyler Brown
 "Wake and Bake features additional vocals by Gianni Ca$h

Personnel
Credits for Strangeulation Vol. II adapted from the album liner notes.

 Richie Abbott – publicity
 Erich Azbill – street marketing & promotions
 Tom Baker – mixing
 Big Scoob – featured artist
 Brent Bradley – internet marketing
 Skyler Brown – additional vocals
 Violet Brown – production assistant
 Valdora Case – production assistant
 Jared Coop – merchandising
 Glenda Cowan – production assistant
 Ben "Bengineer" Cybulsky – engineer, mixing
 Dr. James "Strangelove" D'Angelo – Strange physician
 Penny Ervin – merchandising
 Braxton Flemming – merchandising
 Flip – additional vocals
 Godemis – featured artist
 Mary Harris – additional vocals, merchandising
 JL B. Hood – featured artist
 Krizz Kaliko – featured artist
 Samantha Levi – photographer
 Robert Lieberman – legal
 Liquid 9 – art direction & design
 Korey Lloyd – production assistant, project management
 Tyler Lyon – guitar, bass guitar, featured artist
 Bob McDowell – merchandising
 Murs – engineer, featured artist
 Jeff Nelson – internet marketing
 Cory Nielsen – production assistant
 NonMS – percussion
 Dawn O'Guin – production assistant
 Mackenzie O'Guin – featured artist
 Travis O'Guin – A&R, executive producer
 Lucas Parker – guitar
 David Pastorious – bass guitar
 Kelsee Pietz – additional vocals
 Eric Reid – engineer
 Mark Reifsteck – booking
 Rittz – featured artist
 Lauren Robson – additional vocals
 Kerry Rounds – additional vocals
 Darrein Safron – featured artist
 Victor Sandoval – internet marketing
 Seven – musical producer, associate producer
 Brian Shafton – project consultant, general management
 Dale Smith – merchandising
 Stevie Stone – featured artist
 Tech N9ne – A&R, primary artist
 Kaitlyn Toepperwein – street marketing & promotions
 Sean Tyler – production assistant
 Ubiquitous – featured artist
 Taylor Via – street marketing & promotions
 Jan Wainwright – production assistant
 Alien Warr – drums
 Lauren Watkins – internet marketing
 Daniel Watson – engineer
 Dave Weiner – associate producer

Charts

Weekly charts

Year-end charts

References

2015 albums
Tech N9ne albums
Strange Music albums